Craugastor emcelae is a species of frog in the family Craugastoridae.
It is found in Panama and possibly Costa Rica.
Its natural habitats are subtropical or tropical moist lowland forests and subtropical or tropical moist montane forests.
It is threatened by habitat loss.

References

emcelae
Amphibians described in 1985
Taxonomy articles created by Polbot